Islamic Republic of Iran and Hashemite Kingdom of Jordan share a long but complicated relationship which has, at times, been tense and unstable. Jordan has an embassy in Tehran.

Historical relations

Antiquity
While there had been historical contacts between two nations, for most of Jordanian history, the country fell under various Persian rules, started from the Achaemenid Empire to the Sasanian Empire. Because of this, a lot of Persian cultural heritages and influences can be found in Jordan. Both were also later embraced Islam, though Jordan went to become a Sunni country in contrast to the Shi'a-dominated Iran.

Pahlavi Iran
Iranian–Jordanian relations under the Pahlavi dynasty in Iran was cordial, being pro-West oriented and hostile against communism. At 1950s, King Hussein of Jordan inaugurated Jordanian embassy in Tehran, officially established relationship with Iran. However, sometimes relationship went tense, as Iran under the Pahlavi had official relations with Israel, and its distance from the conflict over Palestinian question. Nonetheless, they were able to have a secure and healthy relationship. Hussein also made a number of visits to Iran under Pahlavi.

Islamic Republic of Iran
The outbreak of Iranian Revolution and subsequent establishment of an Islamic regime in Iran changed drastically relationship from positive to negative. Jordan, along with most of the Arabian states of the Persian gulf, immediately backed Saddam Hussein on the Iran–Iraq War of 1980s. Due to Jordan's support for Iraq, even during the Gulf War, it took a decade before Iran and Jordan could re-normalize their relations.

On 2 and 3 September 2003, King Abdullah II of Jordan visited Tehran, making him the first Jordanian king to visit Tehran since the launching of the Islamic revolution in Iran in 1979.

Nonetheless, relations between two countries remain tense, with Iran seeing Jordan's alliance with the West as a threat; and there being little economic cooperation between the two countries. In 2018, Jordan ruled out economic ties, reasoning that Iran is not a member of the World Trade Organization.

Syrian Civil War
Jordan's relations with Iran became even more complicated as Jordan unofficially came out against the government of Bashar al-Assad in Syria (an ally of Iran), considering Iranian long-term presence in Syria as a threat to its security. Jordan was also alleged to have been working with Saudi Arabia, Russia, and Israel in an attempt to curb Iranian involvement in Syria.

On July 19, 2021, US president Joe Biden met with Jordanian king Abdullah II and discussed, among other things, the future of the Syrian crisis. In that meeting King Abdullah suggested Biden cooperate with Russia and the Syrian Government to help stabilize Syria and restore Syrian sovereignty and unity.

Iraq
During the rule of Saddam Hussein, Jordan maintained a "special status" with Iraq as it relied on Iraqi oil. Iraq also relied on Jordan during this time for use of its ports, as the UN had placed sanctions on Iraq for the invasion of Kuwait.

This support of Baathist Iraq resulted in a complete severance of ties between Jordan and Iran on January 31, 1981, and since then relations have remained fairly hostile.

Jordan's ties with Israel and Saudi Arabia
Another key reason for tensions between Jordan and Iran is Jordan's relationship with Saudi Arabia and Israel.

For many years, Jordan heavily depended on Saudi economic assistance. Jordan also shares similar political structure with Saudi Arabia, both are Arab monarchies and closely tied to the West. Growing Iranian influence brought Jordan and Saudi Arabia closer, with both denouncing Iran together in spite of the rise of Crown Prince Mohammed Bin Salman.

Jordan also shares a close tie with Israel, since the Hashemites had unofficial relations with Israel throughout the Cold War until 1994 when  the two countries established relations.

The Iranian Government, which has been Muslim since 1979, has called for the elimination of Israel and pro-West Arab monarchies; prompting anti-Iranian reactions in both Jordan and Israel.

Some have alleged Saudi Arabian and Israeli involvement in the failed April 2021 coup attempt in Jordan, which has been related to Jordanian unofficial opposition to the 'deal of the century' proposed by the United States as a solution to the Israeli-Palestinian Conflict.

Qatar crisis
Both Iran and Jordan had called to solve the Qatar crisis diplomatically in hope to limit tensions. Jordan, while still maintaining its diplomatic presence within the country, had limited ties with Qatar, as Jordan is dependent on Gulf economically, especially after the 2018 Jordanian protests. On the other side, Jordan feared the escalation of tensions between Qatar and its Gulf neighbors Saudi Arabia, Bahrain and the United Arab Emirates might give Iran an upper hand.

The New Levant Initiative 
On 27 June 2021, at a trilateral summit in Baghdad, the Jordanian king announced an agreement with Egypt and Iraq to increase cooperation and trade, including the transport of oil from Iraq through Jordan (and Egypt). This officially became known as the “New Levant Initiative'' (NLI). Following this agreement, Jordanian state media began promoting Iranian-Jordanian cooperation, and suggesting that this deal would increase Jordanian ties with Iran. It was suggested that Iran could build an airport in al-Kerak, and begin the supply of oil to Jordan via Iraq to fulfill Jordan's economic needs. Some Jordanian politicians such as Zaid Nabulsi, a member of the king's advisory board, and Mouafaq Mahadeen, a journalist with close ties to the ruling family, have also began promoting the idea of Iranian religious tourism to the shrine of Jafar ibn Abu Talib in the city of Karak, the home of Jordan's Shiite minority. Jordanian king Abdullah II also visited the site of the shrine in July 2021 in an attempt to promote it.

Iranian network intelligence in Jordan
The threat of Iranian intelligence networks in Jordan has increased since the establishment of Islamic Government in Iran. In 2004, Jordanian King Abdullah II accused Ahmed Chalabi, an Iraqi, as an Iranian agent for providing to Iran ammunitions, weaponry and explosions to attack Jordan.

In 2018, a top military commander of the Armed Forces of the Islamic Republic of Iran, Brigadier General Ahmad Reza Pourdastan, revealed that Iran has enough network intelligence data over the military movements, bases and its strength of a number of Arab countries in the Middle East, including Jordan; and has threatened to attack if they are provoked.

Iranian Embassy 
The Iranian embassy is located in Amman.

 Ambassador Mojtaba Ferdosipour

References

 
Jordan
Iran
Relations of colonizer and former colony